Charles Church Roberts (March 6, 1882 – March 8, 1957) was a United States Navy sailor and a recipient of the United States military's highest decoration, the Medal of Honor. He was awarded the medal for his actions during a fire aboard the battleship  in 1910. He later served in World War I and became a commissioned officer.

Biography
Roberts was born on March 6, 1882, in Newton, Massachusetts. He enlisted in the U.S. Navy from Illinois in about 1904.

By September 8, 1910, he was serving as a machinist's mate first class on the battleship . On that day, while North Dakota was conducting tests using oil as fuel, an explosion occurred, killing three sailors and endangering the ship. In the engine room, pieces of hot coal and coke floated in waist-high hot water, oil was aflame above one of the boilers, and the entire room was filled with smoke, steam, and fumes. Despite these dangers, Roberts and five other men of the ship's engineering department entered the engine room to haul the boiler fires and perform other tasks necessary to prevent a boiler explosion. After ensuring the safety of the ship, they then searched for and removed the bodies of the three sailors killed in the initial explosion.

For these actions, Roberts and the five other men were approved for the Medal of Honor a month later, on October 4. On 13 June 1911, President Taft presented all six heroes with their medal in a ceremony at the White House. The others were Chief Machinist's Mate Thomas Stanton, Chief Machinist's Mate Karl Westa, Chief Watertender August Holtz, Chief Watertender Patrick Reid, and Watertender Harry Lipscomb.

In 1917 during World War I, Roberts was appointed to the warrant officer rank of machinist and served on board . He resigned his commission in June 1921.

Roberts died on March 8, 1957, two days after his 75th birthday, and was buried at Prospect Hill Cemetery in Millis, Massachusetts.

Medal of Honor citation
Roberts's official Medal of Honor citation reads:
Serving on board the U.S.S. North Dakota; for extraordinary heroism in the line of his profession during the fire on board that vessel, 8 September 1910.

See also

 List of Medal of Honor recipients during peacetime

References

External links
 
 

1882 births
1957 deaths
People from Newton, Massachusetts
United States Navy officers
United States Navy Medal of Honor recipients
United States Navy personnel of World War I
Non-combat recipients of the Medal of Honor
Burials at Prospect Hill Cemetery (Millis, Massachusetts)
Military personnel from Massachusetts